Gemini Orleans (born Victor Mawuli Orleans-Fiaka; born May 29, 1989) is a Ghanaian hip hop artist who is known for the singles Never forget me, O day O day which features Edem and Sarkodie. He was featured on Sarkodie's Makye Album which won the Album of the Year in the 2010 Ghana Music Awards. In 2013 he was featured on the Something ELse Album by rapper EL together with Donae'o, Joey B and M.anifest which won the VGMA Album of the Year.

Early life 
Gemini was born to Christian “Papa Brown” Orleans-Fiaka and Wilhelmina Rose Orleans-Fiaka on May 29, 1989, at Mataheko, a suburb of Accra, in the Greater Accra Region of Ghana.

Education 
He attended Aggrey Memorial for his secondary education before continuing to study BSc. Banking and Finance degree programme at the University of Professional Studies.

Career 
He started his career rapping at age fifteen in Aggrey Memorial A.M.E. Zion Secondary School and by the time he was through in 2007 he was awarded the best rapper of his year group at their annual awards night program held by the school authorities in appreciation of special student participation and academic brilliance.He is a powerful artist.

Production 
 Gemini Orleans - Rap exercises Ft EL (prod. by X Family)
 Gemini Orleans - Fiona Ft Kelvyn Boy
 Gemini Orleans - Communicate
 Gemini Orleans - CYS Remix
 Gemini Orleans - Tempted Ft J.Derobie

References

External links 

1989 births
Living people
Ghanaian hip hop musicians